"Acting Like That" is a song by English musician Yungblud featuring American musicians Machine Gun Kelly and Travis Barker, released on 2 December 2020 as the sixth single from the former's second studio album Weird!.

Background
The song was written about a night the two vocalists spent together after the death of the mutual friend Juice Wrld. According to Yungblud, despite being saddened by the event, they cheered one another up by deciding that they were "way too cool to be acting like that".  The following morning, they wrote the song.

The song is the third collaboration between the three musicians, following 2019's "I Think I'm Okay" and 2020's "Body Bag", which also featured Bert McCracken. The release of the song was announced on 30 November 2020, which was followed by Yungblud began releasing teasers for the song on social media in the following days.
The song was officially released on 3 December 2020, as the sixth single from Yungblud's second studio album Weird!.

Music video
A music video for the song was released on 21 January 2021. The video parodies the different reaction to the then-ongoing COVID-19 pandemic, through the metaphor of a zombie apocalypse. Because of the pandemic, Yungblud and Machine Gun Kelly's segments of the video were filmed separately in Greenwich, London and Los Angeles respectively. The video also features a cameo from social media influencer Abby Roberts, as a zombie who infects Yungblud.

Reception
The Guardian writer Issy Simpson perceived the song to be objectifying, stating that "Being a woman in 2020 can be tough, but luckily for us girls, there's always a man around to tell us exactly how to behave" and that "they're wrong, because there's no attractiveness barrier to being a complete mess: it's an equal-opportunities activity". Clash called it a love it or hate it song but contended that that's where both artists do best.

According to an article by NME, users on TikTok drew comparisons between the song's chorus melody and that of Metro Station's 2008 song "Shake It". In response, Metro Station tweeted they felt "honored".

Personnel
Credits adapted from Tidal.

Musicians

Yungblud – vocals, composition, lyrics
Machine Gun Kelly – vocals, composition, lyrics
Travis Barker – drums, production, composition, lyrics
Chris Greatti – composition, lyrics, background vocals
Nick Long – composition, lyrics
Zakk Cervini – composition, lyrics, vocal programming

Technical

Adam Hawkins – engineering, mixing
K Thrash – engineering
Matt Malpass – engineering
Shaan Singh – engineering

Charts

References

2020 singles
2020 songs
Machine Gun Kelly (musician) songs
Pop punk songs
Travis Barker songs
Yungblud songs